WVBX (99.3 FM "Live 99.3") is a commercial radio station licensed to Spotsylvania, Virginia and serving the Metro Fredericksburg area.  WVBX is owned and operated by Alpha Media LLC, through licensee Alpha Media Licensee LLC.  It airs a contemporary hit radio format.

History

The station first launched on January 26, 1988, with the call sign WYND-FM.  It aired a smooth jazz/new age music format and was owned by Richard J. Hayes and Associates.  On April 10, 1989, WYND-FM changed to WPLC, simulcasting the Urban Contemporary format of then-WPLZ in Petersburg, also on 99.3. It became WYSK on September 30, 1994.

In 1994, the station was purchased by The Free Lance–Star, a daily newspaper in Fredericksburg.  On July 16, 1996, WYSK modified its call letters to WYSK-FM, switching to an Adult Contemporary format.  On March 4, 2002, WYSK-FM flipped to Alternative Rock, branded as "99.3 WYSK – The Rock Alternative."

At noon on January 7, 2008, WYSK-FM dropped its Alternative format and switched to Rhythmic Contemporary Hit Radio with the station's first song being Justin Timberlake's "SexyBack". The call letters were changed from WYSK to WWVB-FM on January 11, 2008 to go along with the new moniker "The Vibe."

On August 13, 2009, the call sign was changed from WWVB-FM to WVBX.

On January 23, 2015, Alpha Media "entered into a definitive agreement" to purchase WVBX and sister stations WFLS-FM, WNTX, and WWUZ from Free Lance-Star License, LLC. The purchase was consummated on May 1, 2015, at a price of $8.1 million.

On June 1, 2018, WVBX rebranded as "Live 99.3." The station is now airing a more traditional contemporary hit radio playlist, moving away from the rhythmic format.

References

External links
Live 99.3 Online

Contemporary hit radio stations in the United States
VBX
Radio stations established in 1988
Alpha Media radio stations